Jens Christensen (born 18 December 1953) is a Danish sailor. He competed in the Star event at the 1980 Summer Olympics.

References

External links
 

1953 births
Living people
Danish male sailors (sport)
Olympic sailors of Denmark
Sailors at the 1980 Summer Olympics – Star
Sportspeople from Copenhagen